Joby Harris (born February 21, 1975) is a designer and director in Los Angeles, California. He is also the lead singer and guitar player for the American post-hardcore band Crash Rickshaw.  He is currently a visual strategist for NASA and the Jet Propulsion Laboratory in Pasadena, California.

Music
Harris performed in Crash Rickshaw on two albums to date. A self-titled album on Seattle based record label Tooth & Nail Records in late 2001 and a second album entitled The Unknown Clarity independently released in 2005. In late 2016, Watchmaker Records announced a re-release of The Unknown Clarity on vinyl.

Harris previously spent time performing with Pittsburgh local punk band Phatso, as well as Orange County, California bands Rainy Days, and The Moodswingers opening for such acts as At the Drive In, P.O.D., Project 86 and Zao.

In late 2009, he wrote and co-performed an independently released fight song for professional NFL football team the Pittsburgh Steelers.

Visual art
In December 2011, Harris became a finalist in the Doritos Crash the Super Bowl commercial contest. His commercial "Bird of Prey" airs on television in the United States and Canada.

While working as a visual strategist for NASA's JPL, Harris illustrated several vintage-style travel posters showing terrestrial getaways to other planets, moons and exoplanets such as Kepler-186f, HD 40307 g and Kepler-16b entitled "Visions of the Future". The posters received international attention in major news outlets, television shows such as The Big Bang Theory, Marvel's Runaways (TV series) and the motion picture release Replicas (film) starring Keanu Reeves.

Discography

With Crash Rickshaw
 The Unknown Clarity (2008)
 Crash Rickshaw (2001)

References

External links
 
 
 https://web.archive.org/web/20100606034722/http://www.indievisionmusic.com/2010/05/28/project-86-world-premiere-of-video/

Living people
1975 births
Artists from Pennsylvania
Artists from Los Angeles
People from Butler County, Pennsylvania
Guitarists from Pennsylvania
Guitarists from Los Angeles
American male guitarists
21st-century American guitarists
21st-century American male musicians
Crash Rickshaw members